Bernard James "Bus" Mertes (October 6, 1921 – January 17, 2002) was an American football player and coach.  He played college football at the University of Iowa and professionally in the National Football League (NFL) and the All-America Football Conference (AAFC) with the Chicago Cardinals, Los Angeles Dons, Baltimore Colts, and New York Giants.  Mertes served as the head football coach at Bradley University from 1951 to 1952, at Kansas State University from 1955 to 1959, and at Drake University from 1960 to 1964, compiling a career college football coaching record of 50–63–1.

Coaching career

Kansas State
Mertes was the 24th head football coach at Kansas State University in Manhattan, Kansas, and he held that position for five seasons, from 1955 until 1959.  His record at Kansas State was 15–34–1.

Drake
After leaving Kansas State following the 1959 season, Mertes became the 19th head football coach at Drake University in Des Moines, Iowa, serving for five seasons, from 1960 until 1964.  His record at Drake was 27–19.

Denver Broncos
After leaving Drake following the 1964 season, Mertes joined the Denver Broncos of the American Football League as an assistant coach.  He coached with Denver for two seasons.

Minnesota Vikings
After leaving the Denver Broncos, Mertes joined Bud Grant's coaching staff on the Minnesota Vikings of the NFL.  He coached the running backs and special teams, working with players such as Bill Brown, Dave Osborn, Ed Marinaro, Chuck Foreman, Ted Brown, Darrin Nelson, Greg Coleman, and Fred Cox.  As an assistant with the Vikings from 1967 to 1984, he coached in four Super Bowls.

Head coaching record

References

External links
 
 

1921 births
2002 deaths
American football running backs
Baltimore Colts (1947–1950) players
Bradley Braves football coaches
Chicago Cardinals players
Denver Broncos coaches
Drake Bulldogs football coaches
Iowa Hawkeyes football players
Iowa Pre-Flight Seahawks football players
Kansas State Wildcats football coaches
Los Angeles Dons players
Minnesota Vikings coaches
New York Giants players
San Francisco 49ers players
Sportspeople from Chicago
Players of American football from Chicago